Mohamad Ishak bin Kunju Mohamad is a former Malaysian footballer, and current head coach of PDRM.

References

External links
 

Malaysian footballers
Terengganu FC players
Negeri Sembilan FA players
Association football defenders
Living people

Year of birth missing (living people)